This is a list of 143 species in Polana, a genus of leafhoppers in the family Cicadellidae.

Polana species

 Polana agrilla DeLong & Freytag 1972 c g
 Polana alata DeLong & Freytag 1972 c g
 Polana alia DeLong & Freytag 1972 c g
 Polana alitera DeLong & Freytag 1972 c g
 Polana amapaensis Coelho 1991 c g
 Polana ancistra Freytag 2007 c g
 Polana aneza DeLong & Freytag 1972 c g
 Polana ardua DeLong & Freytag 1972 c g
 Polana aspersa DeLong & Freytag 1972 c g
 Polana assula DeLong & Freytag 1972 c g
 Polana belema DeLong 1984 c g
 Polana bena DeLong & Freytag 1972 c g
 Polana bicolor Spångberg 1878 c g
 Polana bidens DeLong & Freytag 1972 c g
 Polana bitubera DeLong & Foster 1982 c g
 Polana bohemani Stål 1864 c g
 Polana boquetea DeLong & Wolda 1984 c g
 Polana brevis Freytag 2007 c g
 Polana bruneola Osborn 1938 c g
 Polana bulba DeLong & Freytag 1972 c g
 Polana calvanoa DeLong & Wolda 1984 c g
 Polana caputa DeLong 1980 c g
 Polana carla DeLong 1980 c g
 Polana celata Fowler 1903 c g
 Polana celsa DeLong & Freytag 1972 c g
 Polana censora DeLong & Wolda 1984 c g
 Polana chelata DeLong & Freytag 1972 c g
 Polana chena DeLong & Wolda 1978 c g
 Polana chifama DeLong & Freytag 1972 c g
 Polana clarita DeLong & Wolda 1982 c g
 Polana clavata DeLong & Wolda 1984 c g
 Polana cochlea DeLong 1980 c g
 Polana concinna Stål 1862 c g
 Polana confusa DeLong 1984 c g
 Polana coresa DeLong & Freytag 1972 c g
 Polana coverra DeLong 1979 c g
 Polana cumbresa DeLong & Wolda 1984 c g
 Polana cupida DeLong & Freytag 1972 c g
 Polana danesa DeLong & Freytag 1972 c g
 Polana declivata Freytag 2007 c g
 Polana desela DeLong 1979 c g
 Polana dispara DeLong & Freytag 1972 c g
 Polana diversita DeLong & Wolda 1982 c g
 Polana docera DeLong & Wolda 1982 c g
 Polana elabora DeLong & Freytag 1972 c g
 Polana elera DeLong & Freytag 1972 c g
 Polana exornata Fowler 1903 c g
 Polana extranea Fowler 1903 c g
 Polana falsa DeLong & Freytag 1972 c g
 Polana fenestra DeLong 1984 c g
 Polana fetera DeLong & Freytag 1972 c g
 Polana fina DeLong & Freytag 1972 c g
 Polana flectara DeLong & Freytag 1972 c g
 Polana fusconotata Osborn 1938 c g
 Polana gatunana DeLong & Wolda 1984 c g
 Polana gelera DeLong & Freytag 1972 c g
 Polana gomezi DeLong 1979 c g
 Polana gracilis Spångberg 1883 c g
 Polana helara DeLong & Freytag 1972 c g
 Polana helvola DeLong 1979 c g
 Polana icara DeLong & Freytag 1972 c g
 Polana inclinata DeLong & Freytag 1972 c g
 Polana inimica DeLong & Freytag 1972 c g
 Polana insulana Freytag & Cwikla 1982 c g
 Polana insulia DeLong 1984 c g
 Polana intricata  g
 Polana julna DeLong & Wolda 1982 c g
 Polana laca DeLong & Freytag 1972 c g
 Polana lamina DeLong 1979 c g
 Polana lanara DeLong & Freytag 1972 c g
 Polana lerana DeLong & Triplehorn 1979 c g
 Polana luteonota DeLong 1979 c g
 Polana macuella DeLong & Freytag 1972 c g
 Polana macula DeLong & Freytag 1972 c g
 Polana mala DeLong & Freytag 1972 c g
 Polana melalbida DeLong 1979 c g
 Polana melella DeLong 1979 c g
 Polana mella DeLong & Freytag 1972 c g
 Polana merga DeLong & Freytag 1972 c g
 Polana minima Freytag 2007 c g
 Polana miramara DeLong & Wolda 1984 c g
 Polana naja  g
 Polana nebulosa Stål 1862 c g
 Polana nida DeLong & Freytag 1972 c g
 Polana nidula DeLong & Freytag 1972 c g
 Polana nigrolabes DeLong & Wolda 1978 c g
 Polana nisa DeLong & Freytag 1972 c g
 Polana obliqua DeLong & Freytag 1972 c g
 Polana obtecta DeLong & Freytag 1972 c g
 Polana obtusa Spångberg 1878 c g
 Polana ocellata Spångberg 1878 c g
 Polana onara DeLong & Triplehorn 1979 c g
 Polana optata DeLong & Freytag 1972 c g
 Polana orbita DeLong & Freytag 1972 c g
 Polana orcula DeLong & Foster 1982 c g
 Polana ordinaria Freytag 2007 c g
 Polana pandara DeLong & Freytag 1972 c g
 Polana papillata Freytag & Cwikla 1982 c g
 Polana parca DeLong & Freytag 1972 c g
 Polana parvula DeLong & Freytag 1972 c g
 Polana peda DeLong & Freytag 1972 c g
 Polana pendula DeLong & Freytag 1972 c g
 Polana pensa DeLong & Freytag 1972 c g
 Polana piceata Osborn 1938 c g
 Polana plumea DeLong & Freytag 1972 c g
 Polana portochuela DeLong & Foster 1982 c g
 Polana praeusta Stål 1854 c g
 Polana pressa DeLong & Freytag 1972 c g
 Polana principia DeLong & Freytag 1972 c g
 Polana putara DeLong 1979 c g
 Polana quadrilabes DeLong & Freytag 1972 c g
 Polana quadrina DeLong 1979 c g
 Polana quadrinotata (Spangberg, 1878) c g b
 Polana quadripunctata Stål 1862 c g
 Polana quatara DeLong & Freytag 1972 c g
 Polana randa DeLong & Freytag 1972 c g
 Polana raseca DeLong & Triplehorn 1979 c g
 Polana resilara DeLong & Freytag 1972 c g
 Polana resupina DeLong & Freytag 1972 c g
 Polana retenta DeLong & Freytag 1972 c g
 Polana rixa DeLong & Freytag 1972 c g
 Polana robusta DeLong 1980 c g
 Polana ruppeli DeLong & Freytag 1972 c g
 Polana sana DeLong 1979 c g
 Polana scela DeLong & Freytag 1972 c g
 Polana scina DeLong & Freytag 1972 c g
 Polana scruta DeLong & Freytag 1972 c g
 Polana sereta DeLong & Freytag 1972 c g
 Polana solida DeLong 1979 c g
 Polana spindella DeLong & Freytag 1972 c g
 Polana squalera DeLong & Freytag 1972 c g
 Polana thugana DeLong & Triplehorn 1979 c g
 Polana tinae DeLong & Wolda 1982 c g
 Polana tortora DeLong 1980 c g
 Polana tropica DeLong & Triplehorn 1979 c g
 Polana truncata DeLong & Freytag 1972 c g
 Polana tuberana DeLong & Foster 1982 c g
 Polana tulara DeLong & Freytag 1972 c g
 Polana unca DeLong & Freytag 1972 c g
 Polana vana DeLong & Freytag 1972 c g
 Polana venosa Stål 1854 c g
 Polana villa DeLong & Freytag 1972 c g
 Polana villara DeLong 1979 c g

Data sources: i = ITIS, c = Catalogue of Life, g = GBIF, b = Bugguide.net

References

Polana